Memorial of Glory is a city memorial located on Suvorov Square of Tiraspol, the capital of Transnistria. It commemorates the Veterans and the dead of the Great Patriotic War, the Soviet-Afghan War, and the Transnistria War.

History

Early years
In the 1920s, a square was located on the site of the Memorial of Glory. The commissioner of the cavalry brigade Grigory Kotovsky was buried there during the Russian Civil War after the liberation of Tiraspol from the White Guard. The decision to create a memorial complex in Tiraspol was made in the early 1970s. The construction of the memorial was very popular within the city. The construction of the memorial saw the participation of all organizations, enterprises and educational institutions of the city, with civil servants such as office workers assisting every day after work for 5 hours in the construction of the memorial. The construction process was at that time was headed by Hero of Socialist Labor I. D. Dyachenko. The authors of the project were sculptors Leonid Fishbein and Garry Faif. The complex was opened on Defender of the Fatherland Day in 1972. That same day, a solemn ceremony of the reburial of Red Army soldiers and officers at the complex was held (mostly natives of Transnistria and the Moldovan SSR). When the Memorial of Glory was opened, employees of the Tiraspol Museum of History and Local Lore wrote about 900 letters to the relatives and friends of the soldiers buried at the memorial.

Later developments
The T-34-85 tank erected at the memorial was transported from Hungary in April 1945.  During the Second World War, it was a combat vehicle of Lieutenant Boris Sergeev, who served with his father, Vasily Antonovich Sergeev, a prominent Colonel in the Red Army. 
Boris and his crew died under the Budapest Offensive (January 1945), and the machine was transported back to the territory of the Soviet Union, according to the request of his father. Under it is stored a capsule with earth brought from the city of Volgograd. The last burials at the Glory Memorial were held in 1992. Among them was Nikolai Ostapenko, the head of the Slobodzeysky District Council of People's Deputies, who died on 30 April 1992 in an attack. Another part of the memorial is a monument opened in 1995 dedicated to the soldiers who died in the Soviet-Afghan War.

Reconstruction
In 2009-2010, the Glory Memorial was reconstructed. During the reconstruction, the Wall of Memory was erected, on which the names of all the Transnistrian defenders who died in 1990-1992 are carved. There is also a sculpture of the Grieving Mother. For the repair of the Glory Memorial, 1 million rubles (105,000 dollars) were allocated from the budget.  The reconstructed Memorial of Glory was opened in early August 2010. On 17 August 2010, the Memorial of Glory was subjected to an act of vandalism. A fragment of a sculpture of a Soviet Army soldier in Afghanistan was stolen. In October 2011, the chapel of St. George the Victorious was built and consecrated.

Tomb of the Unknown Soldier

The Tomb of the Unknown Soldier is the centrepiece of the memorial, flanked by an eternal flame. The eternal flame at the grave of the unknown soldier was lit by Hero of the Soviet Union Mikhail Kharin, a participant Second Jassy–Kishinev Offensive. On 12 April 1972, the 28th anniversary of the liberation of Tiraspol from the Nazis, students of the Tiraspol Secondary School No. 6 posted the honorary guard at the eternal flame. It is currently dedicated to the memory of the war dead from the first outbreak of fighting on 3 March 1992.

Gallery

References 

Tiraspol
Soviet military memorials and cemeteries
Monuments and memorials built in the Soviet Union
Buildings and structures completed in 1972
Tombs of Unknown Soldiers
Monuments and memorials in Moldova